Lot 13 is a township in Prince County, Prince Edward Island, Canada.  It is part of Richmond Parish. Lot 13 was awarded to John Pownall, Secretary to the Lords of Trade in the 1767 land lottery; and passed to the Marquess of Hertford by 1796.

Communities

Incorporated municipalities:

 Ellerslie-Bideford
 Lady Slipper
 Tyne Valley

Civic address communities:

 Birch Hill
 Ellerslie-Bideford
 Enmore
 Harmony
 Mount Pleasant
 Northam
 Port Hill
 Springhill
 Tyne Valley
 Victoria West

References

13
Geography of Prince County, Prince Edward Island